Anne Johnson, a British archaeologist and historical researcher, is a specialist in the archaeology of Roman forts of the early empire in Britain and the German Provinces. She studied archaeology at University College, Cardiff. Her PhD dissertation has been published in Britain (1983) and Germany (1987). Since 1989 she has worked as an archaeological and historical consultant in Oxford. Other publications include work on Roman military granaries.

References 

British archaeologists
Living people
Alumni of Cardiff University
British women scientists
British women archaeologists
Year of birth missing (living people)